The discography of Steppenwolf, an American Hard rock band, consists of 13 studio albums, nine compilation albums, 21 singles, and three music videos. The band was formed in 1967 after some members of The Sparrows split. Group members included John Kay, Michael Monarch, Goldy McJohn, Rushton Moreve and Jerry Edmonton. Their first album, Steppenwolf, was released in 1968, which sold well and reached 6 on Billboard. That same year, Steppenwolf covered "The Pusher" (previously released by Hoyt Axton). The song was later used in Easy Rider. The album's most successful single was "Born to Be Wild", which reached No. 2 on the Billboard. At the time of the release of second album, The Second, the band's bassist Rushton Moreve had a dispute with band leader John Kay, and was eventually replaced with Nick St. Nicholas. The album's single was "Magic Carpet Ride" which reached number 3 on Billboard.

The band's third album, At Your Birthday Party, reached number 7 on the Billboard. The album's single "Rock Me" reached number 10 on Billboard; no single went that high in the United States after that, although they continued to do well on the Canadian singles chart. Steppenwolf released three more albums by 1972 that had no commercial success and eventually led to the band's dissolution. The band re-formed in 1974 with a new lineup, including John Kay, Jerry Edmonton, Goldy McJohn, George Biondo, and Bobby Cochran. Steppenwolf released three albums during this period, the most successful being "Slow Flux". After three albums, Steppenwolf was dissolved in 1976. The group was re-formed in 1980 and broke up for the last time in 2018. Steppenwolf's newest studio album was Rise & Shine, released in 1990.

Albums

Studio albums

Live albums

Compilation albums

Singles

Videography

Notes

References

External links
 

Discography
Discographies of American artists
Discographies of Canadian artists
Rock music group discographies